Jorge Lugo (born 5 April 1938) is a Venezuelan judoka. He competed in the men's middleweight event at the 1964 Summer Olympics.

References

1938 births
Living people
Venezuelan male judoka
Olympic judoka of Venezuela
Judoka at the 1964 Summer Olympics
Place of birth missing (living people)